The Laurel Blue Hens were a minor league baseball team based in Laurel, Delaware in 1922 and 1923. The Laurel Blue Hens teams played as exclusively as members of the Class D level Eastern Shore League. Laurel hosted home minor league games at League Park.

History
Minor league baseball began in Laurel, Delaware with the 1922 Laurel Blue Hens. Laurel became charter members of the six–team Class D level Eastern Shore League. The Cambridge Canners, Crisfield Crabbers, Parksley Spuds, Pocomoke City Salamanders and Salisbury Indians teams joined the Laurel Blue Hens as Eastern Shore League charter members.

The use of the "Blue Hens" nickname undoubtedly derived from a company of soldiers from Delaware, known for their courage, who acquired the nickname of "The Blue Hen's Chickens" or "Sons of the Blue Hen." The Blue Hen Chicken became the official state bird of the state of Delaware. Relatedly, beginning in 1911, the athletic teams at the University of Delaware became known as the Blue Hens, a moniker that continues to be used by the university today, updated to the Delaware Fightin' Blue Hens.

The Laurel Blue Hens began play when the Eastern Shore League schedule started on June 12, 1922, with the team hosting home games at League Park. Laurel ended the 1922 season with a record of 34–34, placing 4th in the six–team league, finishing 8.5 games behind the 1st place Parksley Spuds, who finished with a record of 42–25. The Crisfield Crabbers (36–32) and Cambridge Canners (37–32) finished ahead of the Laurel Blue Hens, who were followed by the Pocomoke City Salamanders (29–41) and Salisbury Indians (27–41) in the final league standings. Laurel was managed by Sam Frock and briefly, Ducky Davis.

The Laurel Blue Hens continued play in the 1923 Eastern Shore League, in what would be their final season. The Blue Hens placed 3rd in the eight–team league with a 42–30 record. The Laurel Blue Hens finished 7.0 games behind the 1st place Dover Senators while playing under manager John Whalen. Two other league teams folded during the season, as the Milford Sandpipers team withdrew on July 14, 1923 rather than forfeit all of its games due to an ineligible player and the Pocomoke City Salamanders disbanded on August 21, 1923.

On July 19, 1923, in front of a crowd of 4,000, major league baseball commissioner Kenesaw Mountain Landis threw out the first pitch at a game in Salisbury while wearing a Laurel Blue Hens cap to mark the occasion.

After the 1923 season, the Eastern Shore League remained at six teams for the 1924 season. Laurel did not return to play in the 1924 league as the newly formed Easton Farmers franchise replaced Laurel and joined the five returning members. Laurel, Delaware has not hosted another minor league team.

The ballpark
The Laurel Blue Hens teams were noted to have played home minor league games at League Park. The ballpark reportedly no longer exists, with the site becoming residential. It was reported that the Laurel High School band played at home games. The ballpark was located on West Street, between 7th Street and 8th Street in Laurel, Delaware.

Timeline

Year–by–year records

Notable alumni

Eddie Bacon (1923)
Sam Frock (1922, MGR)

See also
Laurel Blue Hens players

References

External links
 Baseball Reference
 Team photo

Defunct baseball teams in Delaware
Defunct Eastern Shore League teams
Baseball teams established in 1922
Baseball teams disestablished in 1923
Laurel, Delaware
Sussex County, Delaware
1922 establishments in Delaware
1923 disestablishments in Delaware